Jesse Stone is the lead character in a series of detective novels written by Robert B. Parker. They were among his last works, and the first series in which the novelist used the third-person narrative. 
The series consists of nine books, starting with Night Passage (1997) and ending with Split Image (2010), which Parker completed before his death in January 2010 but did not live to see published. The series was initially continued by Michael Brandman. In April 2014, Reed Farrel Coleman assumed the writing of the series.

The novels have been adapted into nine TV films. The first eight films were commissioned by CBS, and aired from 2005 to 2012. A ninth film was picked up by the Hallmark Channel, and aired on October 18, 2015. A tenth film was under consideration in 2017.

Overview
The character begins the series at about 35 years old. He is a former minor league baseball shortstop whose career was cut short by a shoulder injury. He was raised in Arizona and California. He was asked to resign from his job as a homicide detective for the LAPD Robbery-Homicide Division because of a drinking problem that began after his divorce from his beautiful wife, Jennifer. Showing up drunk to an interview for a job as police chief for the small town of Paradise, Massachusetts (loosely based on the real town of Marblehead, Massachusetts), Stone is hired because the corrupt president of the town board of selectmen thinks he will be easy to control. Stone quickly notices that the town has big league crimes, struggling with the mob, wildly errant wives and a triple homicide, and that his job will be more difficult than he expected. But, he proves up to the task, beginning with making a corruption case against the town council president and arresting him. In the novels, Stone typically carries a .38 Special snubnosed revolver, the same weapon that he carried as an LAPD detective.<ref>Night Passage (September 1997) </ref>

The series chronicles Stone's cases as chief of the Paradise Police Department, as well as his struggles with alcohol and his complicated relationship with his ex-wife Jenn. He is respected and well liked by the police officers in the town police department. He develops a good working relationship and friendship with the State Police Homicide Commander, Captain Healy.

The character of Jesse Stone, a deeply troubled man, was a departure for the author. Parker, comparing Stone to Spenser, the protagonist of his first series and the one for which he was best known, said, "Jesse is a much more damaged individual who is coming to terms with himself as he goes along."

There is some overlap of characters with the Spenser books, notably with Healy and Sunny Randall, and (in Night and Day) indirectly with Susan Silverman.

Novels
By Robert B. Parker:
 Night Passage (September 1997) 
 Trouble in Paradise (September 1998) 
 Death in Paradise (October 2001) 
 Stone Cold (October 2003) 
 Sea Change (February 2006) 
 High Profile (February 2007) 
 Stranger In Paradise (February 2008) 
 Night and Day (February 2009) 
 Split Image (February 2010) 

By Michael Brandman:
 Robert B. Parker's Killing the Blues (September 2011) 
 Robert B. Parker's Fool Me Twice (September 2012) 
 Robert B. Parker's Damned If You Do (September 2013) 

By Reed Farrel Coleman
 Robert B. Parker's Blind Spot, G.P. Putnam (September 2014) 
 Robert B. Parker's The Devil Wins, G.P. Putnam (2015)
 Robert B. Parker's Debt to Pay, G.P. Putnam (September 13, 2016) 
 Robert B. Parker's The Hangman's Sonnet, G.P. Putnam (September 12, 2017) Robert B. Parker's Colorblind G.P. Putnam's Sons (September 11, 2018) Robert B. Parker's The Bitterest Pill G.P. Putnam's Sons (September 10, 2019) 

By Mike Lupica
 Robert B. Parker's Fool's Paradise, G.P. Putnam (September 8, 2020) 
 Robert B. Parker's Stone's Throw, G.P. Putnam (2021) 

Television adaptations
CBS (and later the Hallmark Channel) adapted the novels as a series of movie specials starring Tom Selleck in the title role; the first was aired in 2005 and the most recent in 2015. Robert Harmon has directed all but one of the films (Dick Lowry directed Jesse Stone: Innocents Lost), and Jeff Beal has provided original music. Select scores from the movies were released on a limited edition CD by Varèse Sarabande in 2009.

The films stay relatively true to storylines and character, with exceptions made mostly for television network viewing. With the fifth film, Selleck and Michael Brandman took over the screen writing, and took the films in new directions. The premise begins when the town council forced Jesse Stone out of his job as the Paradise Chief of Police. The council dubbed it "early retirement" and granted Stone a partial pension. As a retired police officer, Stone was implicitly granted the right to carry concealed firearms, without having a "concealed carry" permit.

Captain Healy hires Stone as an occasional "temporary consultant" to assist on certain state police investigations. Stone insists that he will get back his old job as chief. In the eighth film of the series, Stone is restored as the Chief of Police after the incumbent is murdered. The chairman of the town council asks Stone to return as Chief and catch the killer. Stone's dog plays an important supporting role in the series.

Tom Selleck plays the character as straight from the novels as possible; he is older (late fifties/early sixties vs. late thirties in the books) than Stone. The author, Robert B. Parker, said that he found the Jesse Stone films the most accurate television adaptations of his novels. On his blog, he wrote that "Tom nails the character".

The cast of the films has included the following regular characters: 
Kohl Sudduth as Officer Luther "Suitcase" Simpson.
Kathy Baker as Officer Rose Gammon.
Viola Davis as Officer Molly Crane. The character was replaced by Rose Gammon in Sea Change.
Vito Rezza as Officer Anthony D'Angelo, a Paradise Police deputy. The character was written out of the series in Benefit of the Doubt.
Stephen McHattie as Captain Healy, head of the Massachusetts State Police Homicide Division. 
William Devane as Dr. Dix, a former police officer turned therapist, whom Stone sees for help with his drinking and other personal issues.
Saul Rubinek as Hastings "Hasty" Hathaway, former corrupt bank president and town council president who befriends Stone.
William Sadler as Gino Fish, an organized crime boss who likes Stone, despite their being on opposite sides of the law. Gino sometimes assists Stone on cases with information.

A featured piece of music is Six Pieces for Piano, Op. 118 (Brahms) no.2.

Filmography
 Stone Cold (February 20, 2005)
 Jesse Stone: Night Passage (January 15, 2006) a prequel to Stone Cold Jesse Stone: Death in Paradise (April 30, 2006)
 Jesse Stone: Sea Change (May 22, 2007)
 Jesse Stone: Thin Ice (March 1, 2009)
 Jesse Stone: No Remorse (May 9, 2010)
 Jesse Stone: Innocents Lost (May 22, 2011)
 Jesse Stone: Benefit of the Doubt (May 20, 2012)
 Jesse Stone: Lost in Paradise (October 18, 2015)

Characters

 A dark grey cell indicates the character was not in the film.

Hiatus and relaunch

Although Jesse Stone: Benefit of the Doubt attracted nearly 13 million viewers when CBS aired it on May 20, 2012, producer Michael Brandman told Variety'' a few days later that he and Tom Selleck had been notified that CBS would not be ordering any more episodes. They said the film attracted older viewers, and CBS is moving away from movies and specials in favor of shorter duration TV series. Selleck noted that the movies were expensive to produce, and he had his own money invested in the last few. Selleck said he was not finished with the Stone character. When interviewed by NBC's "Popcornbiz" in August 2012, he said,

Well, right now CBS hasn't ordered another one. That's nothing new. They always seem to order them one at a time even though we kind of hit home runs, which is frustrating. So I'm not sure whether this is the last 'Jesse' or not. I don't think it will be, because there are so many other markets, cable and everything, that I think would want the series.

On March 4, 2015, Hallmark Mysteries & Movies announced it had picked up a ninth film. Selleck himself indicated he was grateful to Hallmark, however he had to produce the movie with $1 million less budget than what CBS provided for the last film done for the network. Only Selleck, Kohl Sudduth, William Devane, and William Sadler returned for the ninth film, with the balance of the cast being new characters. It aired on October 18, 2015. A tenth film was under consideration in 2017.

References

External links
 Jesse Stone at Robert Parker's website
 Megan Walsh-Boyle interview with Tom Selleck - TV Guide - May 2007

American detective novels
American mystery novels by series
Stone, Jesse
Stone, Jesse